Harsh Vashisht is an Indian film and television actor.

Career
Vashisht was also seen in Prem Ya Paheli - Chandrakanta with Triangle Films, Tantra on Colors TV with Swastik Productions, Jolly in Kavach... Mahashivratri on Colors TV with Balaji Telefilms (his 1st show with Balaji) & Ek Veer Ki Ardaas...Veera as Kartar Singh on Star Plus. He worked in Sadda Haq as Harshvardhan Shekhawat on Channel V India. He played the role of Amrit Singh in Doli Armano Ki. He was last seen in Ishq Mein Marjawan as the protagonist Aarohi's Elder Brother, Aniket Kashyap on Colors TV. He was also the face of Pepsodent Toothpaste as the Dentist for 4 years. He was last seen in Aladdin - Naam Toh Suna Hoga as Sultan Firoz, king of Turkmenistan on Sab TV.

Personal life
Harsh's father is veteran character actor Murari Lal Vasishtha, who is also known as Brahmachari. His brother is also an actor Puneet Vashisht.

Vashisht is married to actress Ritu Vashisht.

Filmography

Television

References

External links
 
 

Living people
Indian male film actors
Indian male soap opera actors
Indian male television actors
Place of birth missing (living people)
1976 births